The 1876 Costa Rican general election was held on April 2, 1876. Aniceto Esquivel Sáenz was elected president unanimously thanks to the influence of the acting president Tomás Guardia Gutiérrez who practically hand picked him. At that time and according to the Constitution, there were two electoral rounds; first all citizens legally allowed to vote chose electors and then the voters voted for the president.

Esquivel would not finish his period since that same year he would be overthrown by the brothers Pedro and Pablo Quirós Jiménez in conspiracy with Guardia who was dissatisfied with him and in his place was named the more lenient Vicente Herrera Zeledón, who was Guardia's puppet.

References

Elections in Costa Rica
1876 elections in Central America
Single-candidate elections
1876 in Costa Rica